DeVon Michael Hardin (born August 7, 1986) is an American former professional basketball player. A ,  forward-center, Hardin was selected in the 2008 NBA draft as the 50th overall pick by the Seattle SuperSonics.

High school career
Hardin played at Newark Memorial High School in Newark, California.  He averaged 12.9 ppg, 11.4 rpg and 4.4 bpg as a senior, earning first-team All-Metro honors from the San Francisco Chronicle.

Considered a three-star recruit by Rivals.com, Hardin was listed as the No. 23 power forward and the No. 89 player in the nation in 2004.

College career
Hardin attended the University of California, Berkeley, where he played all of his four collegiate seasons for the Golden Bears and majored in social welfare. He declared for the 2007 NBA draft, but withdrew his name shortly before the event.

Professional career
Hardin was selected 50th overall in the 2008 NBA draft by the Seattle SuperSonics, but suffered a stress fracture in his left tibia and was unable to participate in training camp.  In January 2009, he joined Greek first division club Aigaleo, as a replacement for Andrae Patterson. Hardin had recently been released by Turkish team Mersin BB, after failing to properly recover from the stress fracture.

Hardin's draft rights, along with Chris Wilcox and Joe Smith, were traded to the New Orleans Hornets for Tyson Chandler on February 17, 2009. However, the trade was rescinded a day later, after Chandler failed his physical with the Thunder.

He played for the Philadelphia 76ers in the Orlando Pro Summer League in 2010. On August 1, 2010 Hardin signed with Elitzur Yavne in the second division in Israel.

For the 2011 season he began with Minsk 2006 in Belarus, then he signed with Marinos in Puerto la Cruz Venezuela.

On October 20, 2014 he was signed by Brazilian club Paulistano.

On April 5, 2015, Hardin signed with Barako Bull Energy of the Philippine Basketball Association for the PBA Governors' Cup.

Transactions
June 26, 2008: Selected by the Seattle SuperSonics/Oklahoma City Thunder in the second round (50th overall) of the 2008 NBA draft.
August 6, 2008: Signed by Mersin Büyükşehir Belediyesi S.K. (Turkish Basketball League).
September 12, 2008: Released by Mersin.
January 18, 2009: Signed by Egaleo BC (B Ethniki).
December 1, 2009: Signed by Tulsa 66ers (NBA Development League).
December 18, 2009: Waived by Tulsa due to injury.
December 19, 2009: Re-acquired by Tulsa.
September 15, 2010: Signed by Elitzur Yavne (Liga Leumit).
March 1, 2011: Signed by Gaziantep BB (Turkish Basketball League) from Elitzur Yavne.
October 4, 2011: Signed by BC Minsk-2006 (Belarusian Premier League) from Gaziantep.
December 24, 2011: Released by BC Minsk-2006.
December 28, 2011: Signed by Ciclista Olímpico (LNB Argentina).
January 24, 2012: Released by Olimpico.
January 25, 2012: Signed by Marinos de Anzoátegui (LPB Venezuela).
March 8, 2012: Released by Marinos.
March 22, 2012: Signed by Al Rayyan (Qatari Basketball League).
April 25, 2012: Signed by Hong Kong Bulls (NBL China).
June 15, 2012: Released by Hong Kong.
November 2, 2012: Selected in the second round (23rd overall) of the 2012 NBA Development League Draft by the Rio Grande Valley Vipers.
January 2013: Waived by Rio Grande Valley Vipers
August, 2013: Signed by Basquete Cearense (NBB Brazil).
October, 2014: Signed by Paulistano (NBB Brazil).

References

External links
NBA D-League profile
2008 NBA Draft profile
Player page at Calbears
College player profile

1986 births
Living people
African-American basketball players
Aigaleo B.C. players
American expatriate basketball people in Argentina
American expatriate basketball people in Belarus
American expatriate basketball people in China
American expatriate basketball people in Greece
American expatriate basketball people in Israel
American expatriate basketball people in Qatar
American expatriate basketball people in Turkey
American expatriate basketball people in Venezuela
Basketball players from Long Beach, California
BC Tsmoki-Minsk players
California Golden Bears men's basketball players
Centers (basketball)
Elitzur Yavne B.C. players
Guangzhou Loong Lions players
Greek Basket League players
Novo Basquete Brasil players
People from Newark, California
Power forwards (basketball)
Rio Grande Valley Vipers players
Seattle SuperSonics draft picks
Tulsa 66ers players
American men's basketball players
21st-century African-American sportspeople
20th-century African-American people